The following is a Mackerras pendulum for the 2019 New South Wales state election.

"Safe" seats require a swing of over 10 per cent to change, "fairly safe" seats require a swing of between 6 and 10 per cent, while "marginal" seats require a swing of less than 6 per cent.

All margins are Coalition vs. Labor unless specified otherwise.

Margins by party

Notes

References 

Pendulums for New South Wales state elections